The 27th edition of the Star Awards, Star Awards 2022 (Chinese: 红星大奖2022) is a television award ceremony that honoured the best in Singaporean television released between January and December 2021. The ceremony was held in Singapore on 24 April 2022 at the MES Theatre @ Mediacorp and was hosted by Chen Hanwei.

Romantic drama My Star Bride won a leading three awards including the Best Drama Serial, followed by Recipe Of Life winning two awards for the lead acting roles respectively by Chen's seventh and Huang Biren's fourth, the latter tying Zoe Tay's most number of Best Actress' wins. Five other shows won one award each, including Jeffrey Xu's first acting career win for Star Awards for Best Supporting Actor in his role in The Takedown, and Star Awards 2021 winning its ninth Variety Special. 

Two celebrities, Dennis Chew and Zheng Geping were conferred the All-time Favourite Artiste, while Felicia Chin and Rebecca Lim won their tenth Top 10 Most Favourite Artiste, the latter being the ninth celebrity to win the Top 10 award for ten consecutive times. Two celebrities, Chantalle Ng and Brandon Wong, won their first Top 10 Award this year, the latter being his first nomination in the category after 27 years of his tenure at Mediacorp.

Telecast
The 2022 ceremony was broadcast live on meWATCH, Mediacorp Channel U, Mediacorp Channel 8 and YouTube from 7pm to 10pm on 24 April 2022. There was an exclusive live commentary broadcast on meWATCH from 3:30pm to 10:30pm. A repeat telecast of the Star Awards 2022 will be aired from 2pm to 6.30pm on 1 May 2022 on Mediacorp Channel 8.

Winners and nominees

Awards 
Winners are listed first and highlighted in boldface.

Special awards

Top 10 Most Popular Artiste

Eligible artistes were shortlisted to participate in a nationwide poll of 1,000 people representing an equal breakdown across various age groups across Singapore's demographic, called "Popularity Survey". It was conducted independently by an accredited market research company. 40 artistes were announced on 10 March 2022 and the voting period opened from 11 March 2022, 12:00pm to 24 April 2022, 8:00pm. Each user was limited to one vote per day, but the restriction was lifted to allow unlimited voting on 24 April 2022 from 12:00am to 8:00pm. The weightage of the survey-to-votes were adjusted to 30%-70%.

My Pick! categories
The ceremony also included a minor award ceremony, entitled MyPICK! Awards.

The winners of MY PICK! categories were determined by public voting. Voting began at 12:00 a.m. on 11 March 2022, and closed on 10 April 2022. 11:59pm. All voters with a valid meCONNECT account were eligible to vote and voting was free. For each award category, each voter was limited to one vote every day. On 24 April 2022, the results were revealed during the Star Awards 2022 – Backstage LIVE.

Sponsor awards
These was announced during the Walk-of-fame.

Nominations statistics

Ceremony information
The ceremony's theme, "When the Stars Align, Dreams Come True" (星光荟聚 ，筑梦视界), paid tribute to the challenges caused by the COVID-19 pandemic in Singapore while delivering celebrations with an award show to honour Singapore's content and artistes.

Each program is eligible for a Star Awards only once throughout the show's lifetime, meaning that if any program was nominated for this ceremony, they will be ineligible for the 2023 awards.

For the sixth consecutive year, Bioskin was the main presenter at the Star Awards Ceremony and sponsored the Bioskin Most Charismatic Artist Award. Online voting began on 25 March 2022 and ended on 10 April 2022. The winner for the award was announced during the Red Carpet Show.

The nominees for the performance categories were announced on 16 February 2022 while the popularity categories were announced on 10 March 2022.

The ceremony featured a robot attendant which delivered awards to the recipients during the ceremony. Several guest presenters who were not present at the show - Mickey Huang, Aaron Kwok, and Jacky Wu - appeared via holograms to present the awards.

Presenters and performers
The following individuals presented awards and performed musical numbers.

Notelist

References

External links
 

2022
Impact of the COVID-19 pandemic on television
2022 in Singaporean television